Piggville is an unincorporated community in Powell County, Kentucky, United States.

References

Unincorporated communities in Powell County, Kentucky
Unincorporated communities in Kentucky